Zoológico is a Caracas Metro station on Line 2. It was opened on 4 October 1987 as part of the inaugural section of Line 2 from La Paz to Las Adjuntas and Zoológico. It serves as the terminus of one of the two southern branches of the line. The adjacent station is Caricuao.

References

Caracas Metro stations
1987 establishments in Venezuela
Railway stations opened in 1987